Rudolph Bruno "Bree" Cuppoletti (born June 19, 1910 – September 22, 1960) was a professional American football player who played guard for six seasons for the Chicago Cardinals and Philadelphia Eagles of the National Football League.

Family
Wife: Catherine Alice (Watson) Cuppoletti (d.1970). 
Children: Barbara Lynn, Brenda "Sue" Krall (d.2002), Ralph Cuppoletti, Cathy Jo Cuppoletti Smith (d.2016), Terri Ann Cuppoletti
Grandchildren: 13

References

1910 births
1960 deaths
American football guards
Oregon Ducks football players
Chicago Cardinals players
Philadelphia Eagles players
Players of American football from Minnesota
People from Virginia, Minnesota

http://history.vintagemnhockey.com/page/show/813524-miners-memorial-building